Te Kupenga – Catholic Theological College is a Catholic theological college located in Ponsonby, Auckland, New Zealand, replacing Good Shepherd College, founded in 1998. It arose from the relocation to Auckland of Holy Cross College (the National Catholic Seminary for the training of secular priests) in 1998, and of Mount St Mary's College, Greenmeadows (the seminary, formerly located near Napier, for the training of priests of the Marist order) in 1992. The resources of the seminaries were pooled to set up Good Shepherd College for the formal academic philosophic and theological training of priests and others in New Zealand.

On 1 January 2020, the Good Shepherd College and the Catholic Institute merged to create Te Kupenga – Catholic Leadership Institute, which moved to 40 Vermont Street, Ponsonby, adjacent to the Holy Cross College.

See also
 Holy Cross College, New Zealand
 Marist Seminary
 Holy Name Seminary
St Mary's Seminary

References

External links
Te Kupenga – Catholic Theological College, website
Good Shepherd College, Auckland, website

Educational institutions established in 2020
Seminaries and theological colleges in New Zealand
Catholic universities and colleges in New Zealand
Christianity in Auckland
2020 establishments in New Zealand
Education in Auckland